Tenmile Creek is a stream in Butler and Carter counties in the U.S. state of Missouri. It is a tributary of Cane Creek.

See also
List of rivers of Missouri

References

Rivers of Butler County, Missouri
Rivers of Carter County, Missouri
Rivers of Missouri